Odijk is a town in the Dutch province of Utrecht.

Odijk used to be a separate municipality. It merged with Bunnik and Werkhoven in 1964.

Overview 
The village was first mentioned between 918 and 948 as Iodichem. The etymology is unclear. Odijk developed as an esdorp along the Kromme Rijn. In the 13th century, it became an independent parish. The church and tower were demolished in 1820, because the building was in a bad shape, and a new church was built. In 1840, it was home to 411 people.

Odijk has three primary schools, two churches and many locations for sports activities, such as football, tennis and indoor sports.

Gallery

References

Populated places in Utrecht (province)
Former municipalities of Utrecht (province)
Bunnik